Lisburn North is an electoral ward in Lisburn and Castlereagh. It elects 6 councillors.

Councillors
These are all councillors elected for Lisburn North.

Elections

2014 Council Elections for Lisburn North

2019 Council Elections for Lisburn North

References

Wards of Northern Ireland